Lounge Chair is a 1988 Swiss-French drama film directed by Jean-François Amiguet. It was screened in the Un Certain Regard section at the 1988 Cannes Film Festival. The film was selected as the Swiss entry for the Best Foreign Language Film at the 61st Academy Awards, but was not accepted as a nominee.

Cast
 Jérôme Anger as François
 Kristin Scott Thomas as Marie
 Sylvie Orcier as Marthe
 Patrice Kerbrat as Dubois, le détective
 Alice de Poncheville as Léa
 Judith Godrèche as Stéphane
 Michel Voïta as Le libraire
 Jean Francois Aupied as Narrator
 Véronique Farina as Fleuriste

See also
 List of submissions to the 61st Academy Awards for Best Foreign Language Film
 List of Swiss submissions for the Academy Award for Best Foreign Language Film

References

External links

 

1988 films
Swiss drama films
French drama films
1988 drama films
Films directed by Jean-François Amiguet
1980s French-language films
French-language Swiss films
1980s French films